John Haygoby (fl. 1402) of Bath, Somerset, was an English politician.

He was a Member (MP) of the Parliament of England for Bath in 1402.

References

14th-century births
15th-century deaths
English MPs 1402
People from Bath, Somerset